This is a list of events held and scheduled by the K-1, a kickboxing promotion based in Hong Kong. The first event, K-1 Sanctuary I, took place on March 30, 1993, at Kōrakuen Hall in Tokyo, Japan.

2023 events

2022 events

2021 events

2020 events

2019 events

2018 events

2017 events

2016 events

2015 events

2014 events

2013 events

2012 events

2011 events

2010 events

2009 events

2008 events

2007 events

2006 events

2005 events

2004 events

2003 events

2002 events

2001 events

2000 events

1999 events

1998 events

1997 events

1996 events

1995 events

1994 events

1993 events 

Legend
 
 
 

Sources

See also
 List of K-1 champions
 List of It's Showtime (kickboxing) events

References

External links
K-1 Head Official Website
K-1 Japan Official Website
K-1 China Official Website
K-1 Official Facebook